Takudzwa Ngwenya (born 22 July 1985) is a former rugby union player who played on the wing for the United States national rugby union team and Biarritz Olympique in the Top 14. He made his mark in the 2007 Rugby World Cup with tries against South Africa and Samoa.

Early career
Ngwenya was born in Harare, Zimbabwe. The oldest of three boys, Ngwenya first played rugby in Zimbabwe for the Mashonaland Club and for Vainona High School, from which he graduated in 2003. After moving to the United States, he played for the Plano Rugby Club in Plano, Texas and went on to play for the Dallas Athletic Rugby Club for a few years. He was clocked at 10.5  hand time for the 100 m dash. DARC Rugby sent him to play for the Texas Select Side and the USA Under 19 national team, then the national Sevens team that came first in Bangkok and the 2007 North America 4.

Professional career
Ngwenya was offered a one-month trial at Saracens in England's Guinness Premiership by new coach Eddie Jones. However, he got a considerably better offer from Biarritz in France's Top 14, initially signing a two-year contract with them on 6 November 2007.
 Between 2007 and 2016 Ngwenya played regularly for Biarritz, as a winger. 
Ngwenya scored 2 tries in the 2007-08 Heineken Cup.
In the 2009–10 Heineken Cup he helped the club make their first final since the 2006. He scored 6 tries in the competition which placed him as joint second top try scorer.
 
Ngwenya also had a stellar year in the 2009–10 Top 14 season, starting in 21 games and winning 7 tries. 
In the 2010–11 Heineken Cup Ngwenya scored 5 tries, again tying for second.
During the 2011–12 Top 14 season Ngwenya collected five tries in the Top 14 and added 4 more in the Heineken Cup Ngwenya crossed the whitewash for Biarritz seven times in all competitions during both the 2012–13 and 2013–14 seasons.
 After a season with the San Diego Breakers in the inaugural PRO Rugby season Ngwenya headed back to France and the Top 14 after signing with CA Brive.

Club statistics

International tries

References

External links
 USA Rugby Profile
 ESPNScrum.com Profile
 ItsRugby.co.uk Profile

1985 births
Sportspeople from Harare
Alumni of Vainona High School
Zimbabwean rugby union players
Biarritz Olympique players
World Rugby Awards winners
Living people
Rugby union wings
Zimbabwean emigrants to the United States
Expatriate rugby union players in France
United States international rugby union players
Zimbabwean expatriate rugby union players
Zimbabwean expatriate sportspeople in France
American expatriate rugby union players
American expatriate sportspeople in France
United States international rugby sevens players
Male rugby sevens players
San Diego Breakers players
San Diego Legion players